This is the list of special economic zones (SEZ) in the Philippines created and mandated by the Congress of the Philippines through legislative enactments both by the House of Representatives and Philippine Senate. The list includes general SEZs and the more specific free trade zones and free ports, managed either by the Philippine Economic Zone Authority or held privately.

As of April 30, 2016, there were 345 operating economic zones throughout the Philippines.

Types
Special economic zones are categorized as follows:
 Agro-industrial economic zones (22)
 Free ports and special economic zones
 IT parks/centers (262)
 Manufacturing economic zones (74)
 Medical tourism parks/centers (2)
 Tourism economic zone (19)

Agro-industrial economic zones

Free ports and special economic zones

References

External links
Philippine Economic Zone Authority official website

Philippines
Special economic zones
Special economic zones